Hesperopsis gracielae, known generally as the Macneill's sootywing or Mcneill's saltbush sooty-wing, is a species of spread-wing skipper in the family of butterflies known as Hesperiidae. It is found in Central America and North America.

The MONA or Hodges number for Hesperopsis gracielae is 3981.

References

Further reading

 

Pyrginae
Articles created by Qbugbot